Antti Aleksi Siirala (born 16 May 1979 in Helsinki) is a Finnish pianist.

Antti Siirala's international career was launched when he won First Prize in the 10th Vienna Beethoven competition as the youngest contestant, receiving the special award for the best performance of a late Beethoven sonata (op. 106 “Hammerklavier”). Subsequently, he was awarded First Prize in the London International Piano Competition 2000, the Dublin International Piano Competition (with unanimous jury votes and a special prize for the best Mozart performance) and the Leeds International Piano Competition in 2003 (and the audience prize voted by viewers and listeners to the BBC broadcasts and the live audience in Leeds Town Hall).

Siirala's debut in Brussels in December 2004 was a matchless success. Due to illness the conductor had to cancel on very short notice. Siirala agreed to lead the orchestra from the piano and saved the whole concert by playing in the second half Beethoven's Diabelli variations in place of the orchestra. Immediately he was re-invited for concerts with the Orchestre National and for a recital by the Palais des Beaux Arts.

Standing in for sickened Emanuel Ax in February 2005, Siirala gave a sensational debut recital at the Cologne Philharmonie. According to the newspaper Kölner Stadt-Anzeiger “His recital will be remembered as one of the most outstanding events of this season”. Stepping in for indisposed famous colleagues seemed to be his brand mark throughout the season 2006/07: whether replacing Hélène Grimaud for concerts with the SWR-Sinfonieorchester Freiburg/Baden-Baden under Gielen with his musically expressive but symphonic interpretation of Brahms’ 2nd piano concerto, or Ivo Pogorelich at the Schumannfest Düsseldorf, Michail Pletnev at the Maggio Musicale or Yefim Bronfman with the Bamberg Symphony under Blomstedt, playing Brahms’ 1st piano concerto: everywhere press and audience were enthusiastic about his playing. Blomstedt even invited him to join him at the Baltic Sea Festival the same season and the Bamberg Symphony re-invited him to come back for four concerts with his compatriot Pietari Inkinen in November 2007.

Highlights of the season 2009/2010, for instance, were concerts with the WDR Sinfonieorchester Köln under Semyon Bychkov and the City of Birmingham Symphony Orchestra. In October 2009 Antti Siirala gave his celebrated debut with the San Francisco Symphony Orchestra under Osmo Vänskä and was re-invited immediately. In April 2010 he performed as one of four pianists (next to Pierre-Laurent Aimard, Lang Lang and Martin Helmchen) in the piano series of the Berliner Philharmoniker. In August 2010 Antti Siirala played with the Mostly Mozart Orchestra under Osmo Vänskä at Lincoln Center New York.
Antti Siirala's debut with the Philharmonia Orchestra under Salonen at the sold out 2010/11 opening concert of the Konzerthaus Dortmund was a great success and was celebrated by the audience with standing ovations. In April 2011 Siirala will also make his debut with the Tonhalle Orchestra Zurich under the baton of Xian Zhang.

Antti Siirala works with many renowned conductors, among them Paavo Berglund, Herbert Blomstedt, Michael Boder, Semyon Bychkov, Stéphane Denève, Thierry Fischer, Mikko Franck, Michael Gielen, Miguel Harth-Bedoya, Pietari Inkinen, Kristjan Järvi, Neeme Järvi, Fabio Luisi, Susanna Mälkki, Gerhard Markson, Sakari Oramo, Eiji Oue, François-Xavier Roth, Yutaka Sado, Esa-Pekka Salonen, Jukka-Pekka Saraste, Lan Shui, Stefan Solyom, Osmo Vänskä, Mario Venzago, Hugh Wolff and Xian Zhang.

Siirala is and was invited to play with orchestras like Deutsches Symphonie-Orchester Berlin, Bamberger Symphoniker, Bochumer Symphoniker, hr-sinfonieorchester Frankfurt, Museumsorchester Frankfurt, SWR Sinfonieorchester Freiburg und Baden-Baden, NDR Radiophilharmonie Hannover, Gürzenich-Orchester Köln, WDR Sinfonieorchester Köln, Staatsphilharmonie Rheinland-Pfalz, Tonhalle-Orchester Zürich, Wiener Symphoniker, Tonkünstlerorchester Wien, Orchestre National de Belgique, Orchestre National de Lille, City of Birmingham Symphony, Liverpool Philharmonic, BBC Symphony London, Royal Scottish National Orchestra, Irish National Symphony, Orchestra del Maggio Musicale Fiorentino, Residentie Orkest Den Haag, Iceland Symphony Orchestra, Swedish National Orchestra, Swedish Radio Symphony, Finnish Radio Symphony Orchestra, Sinfonia Varsovia, St. Petersburger Symphoniker, Estonian National Symphony, Detroit Symphony, New Jersey Symphony, Singapore Symphony Orchestra, Tokyo Metropolitan Symphony Orchestra,  Hiroshima Symphony Orchestra, New Japan Philharmonic Orchestra, Yomiuri Nippon Symphony Orchestra as well as with the orchestras of Melbourne and Queensland.

Major milestones on his steadily rising path of success were his recitals at the Lucerne Festival, Klavier-Festival Ruhr, Heidelberger Frühling, Schumannfest Düsseldorf, Europäische Wochen Passau and at the Festivals of Bolzano, Bath and Kilkenny, Moritzburg as well as at the Cologne Philharmonie, Konzerthaus Dortmund, in Hannover Homburg/Saar, Mainz, Leverkusen, Wuppertal, London's Wigmore Hall, Concertgebouw Amsterdam, Tonhalle Zurich, Brussels, Aix-les-Bains, Porto, Milano, Imola, Detroit and at the Metropolitan Museum in New York. For a period of 3 years Antti Siirala was one of the artists in residence of the Konzerthaus Dortmund as part of the ‘Junge Wilde’ series.

His debut recording of Schubert transcriptions for NAXOS received excellent press reviews. For his recording of works by Brahms for ONDINE, he received 6 points out of 6 in the category interpretation from the Piano News magazine. For both recordings Siirala received the Gramophone Magazine's Editor's Choice award.

Beethoven and Brahms are at the core of Siirala's repertoire, but his interest in contemporary music has resulted in first performances of works by Walter Gieseler, Kuldar Sink, Uljas Pulkkis and the premiere of the new piano concerto by Kalevi Aho. Kaija Saariaho's first work for piano solo, “Balladen”, is part of his recital programme.

Discography
 Schubert Piano Transcriptions by Liszt, Prokofiev, Busoni and Godowsky. Naxos 8.555997 (2003)
 Johannes Brahms: Sonata in F-Minor; 16 Waltzes. Ondine ODE 1044-2 (2004)
 Kalevi Aho: Piano Concerto No. 2. Lahti Symphony Orchestra / Osmo Vänskä. BIS-CD-1316 (2010)
 Ludwig van Beethoven: Late Sonatas Nos. 30 - 32, op. 109/110/111. CAvi (2012) 
 Franz Schubert: Quintet for Piano and Strings in a-major D667 "Trout". Benjamin Schmid, Violin / Lars Anders Tomter, Viola / Jan Vogler, Cello / Janne Saksala, Doublebass. Sony (2012)
 Franz Schubert: Die Forelle (The Trout) D 550. Jan Vogler, Cello / Janne Saksala, Doublebass. Sony (2012)
 Matthew Whittall: Hors d`oeuvre. Sony (2012) 
 Ludwig van Beethoven: Triple-Concerto op. 56. Colin Jacobsen, Violin / Jan Vogler, Cello / The Knights / Eric Jacobsen. Sony (2012)

External links
 Antti Siirala
 Antti Siirala's North and South American Management Schmidt Artists
 Antti Siirala's General Management Kirchner Musikmanagement

1979 births
Living people
Musicians from Helsinki
Finnish classical pianists
Sibelius Academy alumni
Prize-winners of the Leeds International Pianoforte Competition
21st-century classical pianists